Robert Dennis Owchinko (born January 1, 1955) is a former professional baseball pitcher. A left-handed pitcher, he played all or parts of ten seasons in Major League Baseball, between 1976 and 1986, for the San Diego Padres, Cleveland Indians, Oakland Athletics, Pittsburgh Pirates, Cincinnati Reds, and Montreal Expos.

Career
Owchinko attended Eastern Michigan University, from where he was picked in the first round (fifth overall) by Peter Bavasi for the San Diego Padres in the 1976 Major League Baseball draft. During his career, Owchinko worked as both a starter and in relief. In 1978, he won a career-high 10 games with the San Diego Padres, along with posting a career-low earned run average (ERA) of 3.56. In 1979, he appeared in a career-high 42 games. On December 9, 1980, he was included in a six-player trade for Bert Blyleven and Manny Sanguillén.

External links

1955 births
Living people
Amarillo Gold Sox players
American expatriate baseball players in Canada
Baseball players at the 1975 Pan American Games
Baseball players from Michigan
Buffalo Bisons (minor league) players
Cincinnati Reds players
Cleveland Indians players
Eastern Michigan Eagles baseball players
Hawaii Islanders players
Indianapolis Indians players
Major League Baseball pitchers
Montreal Expos players
Oakland Athletics players
Pan American Games medalists in baseball
Pan American Games silver medalists for the United States
Pittsburgh Pirates players
San Bernardino Pride players
San Diego Padres players
Tacoma Tigers players
Tampa Tarpons (1957–1987) players
Medalists at the 1975 Pan American Games